The Gepanzerter Mannschaftstransportwagen Kätzchen (Gep. MTW Kätzchen) (German for kitten) was a German armoured personnel carrier of late World War II. Auto-Union delivered two prototypes during 1944–45. The hull's shape was similar to the hull of the Panzerkampfwagen Tiger II, but much smaller. The vehicle had front wheel drive with five or six overlapping steel road wheels, possibly resembling the never-built E-25 "replacement tank"'s suspension system in appearance. Power was provided by a Maybach HL50 P engine.

Auto-Union was ordered to stop work on their design and instead, BMM was given the task of adapting the Hetzer tank destroyer chassis for the role. This was referred to as the Vollkettenaufklärer 38(t) Kätzchen.

References

Bibliography

Further reading
 Rolf Wirtgen (Hrsg.): Vom Auto-Union "Kätzchen" zum SP 15 und SP 12.1. Ein Beitrag zur Vor- und Frühgeschichte der Schützenpanzerentwicklungen in der Bundesrepublik Deutschland. (German) Bundesamt für Wehrtechnik und Beschaffung, Wehrtechnische Studiensammlung, 2012.

World War II armoured fighting vehicles of Germany
Armoured personnel carriers of Germany
Armoured personnel carriers of WWII
Tracked armoured personnel carriers